Petr Bucháček (born 9 June 1948) is a Czech former cyclist. He competed in the individual road race and team time trial events at the 1976 Summer Olympics.

References

External links
 

1948 births
Living people
Czech male cyclists
Olympic cyclists of Czechoslovakia
Cyclists at the 1976 Summer Olympics
People from Ústí nad Orlicí District
Sportspeople from the Pardubice Region